Daode Tianzun, also known as Taishang Laojun is a high Taoist god. He is the Taiqing (太清, lit. the Grand Pure One) which is one of the Three Pure Ones, the highest divinities of Taoism. 

Laozi is regarded to be a manifestation of Daode Tianzun who authored the classic Tao Te Ching. He is traditionally regarded as the founder of Taoism, intimately connected with "primordial" (or "original") Taoism. Popular ("religious") Taoism typically presents the Jade Emperor as the official head deity. Intellectual ("orthodox") Taoists, such as the Celestial Masters sect, usually present Laozi (Laojun, "Lord Lao") and the Three Pure Ones at the top of the pantheon of gods.

Name
His other names include Daode Zhizun (道德至, lit. 'The Universally Honoured Virtuous One') and Daojiao Zhizu (道教之祖, lit. 'The Taoist Ancestor').

Legends

Taishang Laojun believed to be the true incarnation of the spiritual philosopher Laozi, he was already identified as a personification of the Tao as early as the beginning of the Later Han dynasty. According to Daozang, Taishang Laojun had manifested many various incarnations to teach living beings, and Laozi is one of his incarnations. 

According to the biographies of Laozi collected by Ge Hong in the Biographies of the Immortals (神仙傳), Laozi is said to have been born before Heaven and Earth, after 72 years' stay in his mother's womb. He was born under a plum tree with the ability to speak, and took his surname "Li" after the tree. According to the Inscription in Honor of Laozi, written by Bian Shao, Prime Minister of Chen, in the eighth year of the Yanxi era of the Eastern Han dynasty, Laozi came out of the Vital Breath of Chaos, and is as eternal as the three lights of the Sun, Moon and Stars. During the Tang dynasty, the royal family taking Laozi as its ancestor, worshipped him and honored him with many noble titles. 

Although he is ranked below the other two pure ones, he is mentioned in Taoist religious texts more often than the other two. Before he served as an advisor to the Jade Emperor or attending Peach Banquets, he lives in the Great Pure Heaven (Taiqing).

His manifestation anniversary falls on the 15th day of 2nd month of the Chinese lunar calendar.

See also
Tao & Taoism
The Supreme Pure One
Three Pure Ones
Yuanshi Tianzun

References

Works cited
 
 

Chinese gods
Deified Chinese people
Deities in Taoism
Laozi
Journey to the West characters